The Mangbetu are a Central Sudanic ethnic group in the Democratic Republic of the Congo, living in the northeastern province of Haut-Uele.

Culture

The Mangbetu are known for their highly developed art and music. One instrument associated with and named after them is the Mangbetu harp or guitar.  See the National Music Museum and the Hamill Gallery for images. One harp has sold for over $100,000.

Musicologists have also sought out the Mangbetu to make video and audio recordings of their music.

The Mangbetu stood out to European colonists because of their elongated heads.  Traditionally, babies' heads were wrapped tightly with cloth in order to give them this distinctive appearance.  The practice, called Lipombo, began dying out in the 1950s with the arrival of more Europeans and westernization.  Because of this distinctive look, it is easy to recognize Mangbetu figures in African art.

History
The Mangbetu originally came from south Sudan and migrated south to their current location in AD1000. When they arrived into their current location with its new climate and environment (which was different from the much drier lands in south Sudan) they came to be so heavily indebted to Bantu teachers that they borrowed almost their whole vocabulary relating to their new habitat from Bantu languages.

By the early 18th century the Mangbetu had consisted of a number of small clans who, from southward migrations, had come in contact with a number of northward-migrating Bantu-speaking tribes among whom they lived interspersed.  In the late 18th century a group of Mangbetu-speaking elites, mainly from the Mabiti clan, assumed control over other Mangbetu clans and many neighboring Bantu-speaking tribes.  It is likely that their knowledge of iron and copper forging, by which they made weapons and fine ornaments, gave them a military and economic advantage over their neighbors.

References

Further reading
 Christopher Ehret, The Civilizations of Africa: A History to 1800 (University of Virginia Press, 2002), 436–438.
Curtis A. Keim, Mistaking Africa: Curiosities and Inventions of the American Mind (Basic Civitas Books, 1999), 42–43, 92–93.

External links

Ethnic groups in the Democratic Republic of the Congo
Cannibalism in Africa
Haut-Uélé